Arouva castanealis is a species of snout moth in the genus Arouva. It was described by George Hampson in 1906 and is known from Trinidad.

References

Moths described in 1906
Chrysauginae
Moths of the Caribbean